88th NYFCC Awards
December 2, 2022

Best Picture:
Tár

The 88th New York Film Critics Circle Awards, honoring the best in film for 2022, were announced on December 2, 2022. The annual gala awards dinner took place at TAO Downtown Restaurant in New York on January 4, 2023.

Winners

 Best Film:
 Tár
 Best Director:
 S. S. Rajamouli – RRR
 Best Actor:
 Colin Farrell – After Yang and The Banshees of Inisherin
 Best Actress:
 Cate Blanchett – Tár
 Best Supporting Actor:
 Ke Huy Quan – Everything Everywhere All at Once
 Best Supporting Actress:
 Keke Palmer – Nope
 Best Screenplay:
 Martin McDonagh – The Banshees of Inisherin
 Best Animated Film:
 Marcel the Shell with Shoes On
 Best Cinematography:
 Claudio Miranda – Top Gun: Maverick
 Best Non-Fiction Film:
 All the Beauty and the Bloodshed
 Best International Film:
 EO • Poland
 Best First Film:
 Aftersun
 Special Awards:
 Jafar Panahi for "his dogged bravery as an artist, and for the humanity and beauty of a body of work created under the most oppressive circumstances".
 Jake Perlin: curator, distributor, and publisher, in recognition of "his indispensable contributions to film culture".
 dGenerate Films for "their invaluable work bringing independent films from China to a wider audience".
 Special Mentions:
 Cash prizes awarded to two students focusing on film criticism/journalism attending college in the region:
 Undergraduate – Nico Pedrero-Setzer
 Graduate – Greg Nussen

References

External links
 

New York Film Critics Circle Awards
New York
2022 in American cinema
2022 in New York City
New